The 1869 Westbury by-election was fought on 27 February 1869.  The by-election was fought due to the void election of the incumbent MP of the Conservative Party, John Lewis Phipps.  It was won by the Conservative candidate Charles Paul Phipps.

References

1869 elections in the United Kingdom
1869 in England
By-elections to the Parliament of the United Kingdom in Wiltshire constituencies
19th century in Wiltshire
February 1869 events